USS Wayne E. Meyer (DDG-108) is an  guided missile destroyer in the United States Navy. She is named after Rear Admiral Wayne E. Meyer, known as the "Father of Aegis". She carries the 100th AEGIS Weapon System to be delivered to the United States Navy.

Construction
Wayne E. Meyer is the 58th destroyer in her class. She was built by Bath Iron Works, and was christened by sponsor Anna Mae Meyer, wife of Admiral Meyer, and launched on 18 October 2008. She completed sea trials in June 2009, and was delivered to the Navy in July 2009. She was commissioned on the Delaware River, in Philadelphia, Pennsylvania, on 10 October 2009.

Ship history
Wayne E. Meyer arrived at her homeport in San Diego, California, on 4 December 2009.

Wayne E. Meyer made her maiden deployment as part of the  Carrier Strike Group (CSG) from 29 July 2011 until 27 February 2012. She made port calls in Malaysia, Japan, South Korea, Thailand, Bahrain, Dubai, and the Philippines.

In April of that year, CSG-1 cancelled a scheduled port call in Australia, in response to increasing tensions between the United States and North Korea over the latter's nuclear weapons program.

In September 2018 Wayne E. Meyer and  completed homeport swaps. Wayne E. Meyer arrived at Joint Base Pearl Harbor–Hickam on 13 September, and O'Kane got underway for her new homeport of San Diego.

In popular culture
Wayne E. Meyer was featured in the episode "Destroyer Disaster" of the Food Network show, Dinner: Impossible.
Wayne E. Meyer  was used in the filming of Season 2 Episode 5, “Achilles”, TNT Network show The Last Ship.

Awards
 Navy Unit Commendation - (Sep 2011-Jan 2012, Jul 2012-May 2013)
 Navy E Ribbon - (2013, 2014)
 Spokane Trophy - (2014)
 Secretary of the Navy (SECNAV) Energy Conservation Award (Medium ship category) - (2017)

Gallery

References

External links

 
 

 

Arleigh Burke-class destroyers
Ships built in Bath, Maine
2008 ships